Ontario Knife Company, also known as OKC, is an American manufacturer of knives and other edged and military tools.

History 
Ontario Knife Company was founded in 1889 in Naples, New York. They are currently located in Franklinville, New York, in Cattaraugus County, where most of their products are manufactured.

Ontario Knife Company is most well known as a supplier of military knives. Over the years, they have supplied the U.S. military with products such as the M7 bayonet, the USAF Survival Knife, the M1942 Machete, the Navy MK3 MOD 0 diving/survival knife, the M9 bayonet, and most recently, the USMC OKC-3S Bayonet. They have also obtained a contract to build the Aircrew Survival Egress Knife (ASEK) Survival Knife System, chosen by the United States Army to be included in its Air Warrior Equipment System. The knife was tested and approved by PM Soldier and the United States Army Soldier Systems Center to meet the criteria defined by the US Army, and functions include a Plexiglas breaker, hammer, saw teeth, serrations, spear holes, lanyard hole and insulated guard.

Military production 
Complementing their lineup of military issue knives, Ontario Knife Company produces several commercial lines, including the Spec-Plus series, which features many popular military/survival blade designs with updated handle and sheath designs, and the Freedom Fighter series, which features metal hilts and pommels with military/survival blades. Their Randall's Adventure & Training survival knives were designed in conjunction with Randall's Adventure & Training, a popular outdoor survival training and expedition company. The lineup includes the original RTAK (formerly produced by Newt Livesay Blades), and the TAK-1 and RAT-7, both of which have been adopted by the U.S. military.  
 
Ontario Knife Company has also collaborated with other designers such as Justin Gingrich, Bram Frank, and renowned Bowie Knife expert and knifemaker Bill Bagwell, introducing lower cost renditions of several of Bagwell's famous designs.

In addition to their sporting/outdoor knives, Ontario Knife Company produces a large range of other cutlery and tools including Old Hickory kitchen Clcutlery, industrial and agricultural products, and sci-med scientific tools and instruments. Ontario Knife Company is also major supplier of private label blades and knives.

References 

Companies based in Cattaraugus County, New York
Defense companies of the United States
Knife manufacturing companies
Companies based in Ontario County, New York